Yanming is a given name. Notable people with the name include:

Han Yanming (born 1982), Chinese football player who currently plays for Henan Construction as a midfielder in the Chinese Super League
Shi Yanming (born 1964), Shaolin warrior monk
Yan Yanming (1983–2005), Chinese mass murderer who killed nine schoolboys in 2004
Zhao Yanming (born 1981), Chinese football player who currently plays for Tianjin Teda as a goalkeeper in the Chinese Super League